Francis Clifford Watt (20 July 1896 – 8 April 1971)  was a Unionist Party politician, advocate and sheriff in Scotland.

He was elected as Member of Parliament (MP) for Edinburgh Central at a by-election in December 1941, and held the seat until his defeat at the  1945 general election by the Labour Party candidate.

He was qualified as an advocate and a Member of the Scottish Bar, and was awarded King's Counsel (KC) on 20 August 1946. He served as Sheriff of Caithness, Sutherland, Orkney & Zetland from 1952  until his transfer as Sheriff of Stirling, Dumbarton and Clackmannan in 1961. He held that position until his death in 1971.

References

External links 
 

1896 births
1971 deaths
Unionist Party (Scotland) MPs
Members of the Parliament of the United Kingdom for Edinburgh constituencies
UK MPs 1935–1945
20th-century King's Counsel
Scottish sheriffs